Haunted is an original novel based on the U.S. television series Angel. Tagline: "Reality television is taken one step too far." Characters include: Angel, Cordelia, Wesley, Gunn, Lilah Morgan and the Host.

Plot summary
Cordy's finally getting a big break—she will be a contestant on some "reality programming". She must spend five days and four nights in an apparently haunted house. Living with a ghost and catching demons for a living, she sees this as an easy challenge. However, there is more going on than Cordy knows. In a vision on her first night, she sees one of the applicants who didn't make it to the show. She secretly communicates the scenario to Angel and Co., who are instantly on the case.

Angel, Wesley and Gunn search for the missing actress as supernatural activity at the house increases. Soon, Wolfram & Hart also get involved and Cordelia is forced to consider her priorities.

Continuity

The book is supposed to be set in the latter half of Angel season 2, between "Epiphany" and "Over the Rainbow". 
An early possible title was "The House", since promotional coverwork feature this title instead of "Haunted".

Canonical issues

Angel books such as this one are not usually considered by fans as canonical. Some fans consider them stories from the imaginations of authors and artists, while other fans consider them as taking place in an alternative fictional reality. However unlike fan fiction, overviews summarising their story, written early in the writing process, were 'approved' by both Fox and Joss Whedon (or his office), and the books were therefore later published as officially Buffy/Angel merchandise.

External links

Reviews
Litefoot1969.bravepages.com - Review of this book by Litefoot
Teen-books.com - Reviews of this book
Shadowcat.name - Review of this book

Angel (1999 TV series) novels
2002 American novels
2002 fantasy novels
Novels by Jeff Mariotte